Hylaeanthe is a genus of plants native to Central and South America. It contains 5 recognized species:

Hylaeanthe hexantha (Poepp. & Endl.) A.M.E.Jonker & Jonker, Acta Bot. Neerl. 4: 175 (1955). - Brazil, Peru, Ecuador,  Suriname, French Guiana) 
Hylaeanthe hoffmannii (K.Schum.) A.M.E.Jonker & Jonker ex H.Kenn., Monogr. Syst. Bot. Missouri Bot. Gard. 92: 656 (2003). - Costa Rica, Nicaragua
Hylaeanthe panamensis (Standl.) H.Kenn., Ann. Missouri Bot. Gard. 60: 426 (1973). - Colombia, Panamá
Hylaeanthe polystachya (Pulle) A.M.E.Jonker & Jonker, Acta Bot. Neerl. 4: 175 (1955). - Suriname
Hylaeanthe unilateralis (Poepp. & Endl.) A.M.E.Jonker & Jonker, Acta Bot. Neerl. 4: 175 (1955). - Brazil, Paraguay, Peru, Ecuador, Bolilvia, Venezuela, Suriname, French Guiana

References

Marantaceae
Zingiberales genera